This is a list of tennis players who have represented the Denmark Davis Cup team in an official Davis Cup match. Denmark have taken part in the competition since 1921.

Players

References

Lists of Davis Cup tennis players
Davis Cup
Davis Cup
 Davis Cup